Ebon Moss-Bachrach (born March 19, 1977) is an American actor best known for playing the role of David Lieberman in The Punisher and Desi Harperin in Girls. Since 2022, Moss-Bachrach has played Richard "Richie" Jerimovich in the drama series The Bear.

Early life
He was born in Amherst, Massachusetts, and is the son of Renee Moss and Eric Bachrach, who run a music school in Springfield, Massachusetts. He attended high school at Amherst Regional High School in Massachusetts and graduated from Columbia University in 1999. Moss-Bachrach's father was born in Germany to Jewish-American parents.

Personal life
Moss-Bachrach is in a relationship with Ukrainian photographer Yelena Yemchuk, with whom he has two daughters.

Filmography

Film

Television

Theater

References

External links
 
 

1977 births
20th-century American male actors
21st-century American male actors
American male film actors
Columbia College (New York) alumni
American male stage actors
American male television actors
American male voice actors
Jewish American male actors
Living people
Male actors from Massachusetts
People from Amherst, Massachusetts
21st-century American Jews
Amherst Regional High School (Massachusetts) alumni